Nolan Roux (born 1 March 1988) is a French professional footballer who plays as a striker for Championnat National club Châteauroux. He is a former French youth international, having previously represented the France under-21 team.

Club career
Roux scored 15 goals in 34 games for Brest in Ligue 2 during the 2009–2010 season and 6 goals in 28 games in Ligue 1 during the 2010–11 season.

On 21 January 2012, he joined defending champions Lille from Brest on a four-and-a-half year deal.

In 2015, Roux left Lille to sign a three-year deal with Ligue 1 side Saint-Étienne.

On 20 July 2017, he signed a three-year deal to join league rivals Metz for an undisclosed fee. In the 2017–18 Ligue 1 season, Roux scored 15 goals for Metz despite the club finishing last and being relegated to Ligue 2.

On 19 June 2018, Roux signed a two-year deal to join Guingamp.

International career
Roux was a French youth international having made his debut with the under-21 team on 2 March 2010. He has scored twice in two appearances.

Personal life
Nolan is the son of former professional footballer Bruno Roux.

References

External links

 
 
 
 

1988 births
Living people
People from Compiègne
Sportspeople from Oise
Association football forwards
French footballers
France under-21 international footballers
RC Lens players
Stade Brestois 29 players
Lille OSC players
AS Saint-Étienne players
FC Metz players
En Avant Guingamp players
Nîmes Olympique players
LB Châteauroux players
Ligue 1 players
Ligue 2 players
Championnat National players
Championnat National 2 players
Championnat National 3 players
Footballers from Hauts-de-France